Trélon is a commune in the Nord department in northern France.

Trélon forms the western edge of the Calestienne region.

Heraldry

See also
Communes of the Nord department

References

Communes of Nord (French department)